Mušmaḫḫū, inscribed in Sumerian as  MUŠ.MAḪ, Akkadian as muš-ma-ḫu, meaning "Exalted/distinguished Serpent", was an ancient Mesopotamian mythological hybrid of serpent, lion and bird, sometimes identified with the seven-headed serpent slain by Ninurta in the mythology of the Sumerian period. He is one of the three horned snakes, with his companions, Bašmu and Ušumgallu, with whom he may have shared a common mythological origin.

Mythology
In Angim or "Ninurta's return to Nippur", the storm god describes one of his weapons as "the seven-mouthed muš-mah serpent" (line 138), reminiscent of the Greek myth of Heracles and the seven headed Lernaean Hydra he slew in the second of his Twelve labours. An engraved shell of the Early Dynastic period shows Ninğirsu slaying the seven-headed mušmaḫḫū.
 
In the Epic of Creation, Enûma Eliš, Tiāmat gives birth (alādu) to mythical serpents, described as mušmaḫḫū, "with sharp teeth, merciless fangs, instead of blood she filled their bodies with venom".

See also
 Anzû, a massive bird whose death was sometimes credited to Ninurta
 Ninurta's Dragon

References

Characters in the Enūma Eliš
Mesopotamian legendary creatures
Mesopotamian demons
Offspring of Tiamat
Legendary serpents